Shawn Swaboda Lee (October 24, 1966 – February 26, 2011) was an American football defensive tackle who played eleven seasons with the Tampa Bay Buccaneers (1988–89), the Miami Dolphins (1990–91), the San Diego Chargers (1992–97), and the Chicago Bears (1998) in the National Football League. He started in Super Bowl XXIX for the Chargers. Lee and Reuben Davis were nicknamed "The Two Tons of Fun".

Shawn Lee was educated at the University of North Alabama as a communications Major.  He was a co-founder of the Players Community Resource Center.

Lee, who had been struggling with diabetes for the past few years, died on February 26, 2011, from cardiac arrest brought on by double pneumonia. Lee was 44.

References

1966 births
2011 deaths
Sportspeople from Brooklyn
Players of American football from New York City
American football defensive tackles
North Alabama Lions football players
Tampa Bay Buccaneers players
Miami Dolphins players
San Diego Chargers players
Chicago Bears players
Deaths from pneumonia in North Carolina